Mothership.sg is an online news website that operates in Singapore. It was founded in August 2013 and officially launched in February 2014.

History 
Mothership.sg begun with Lien We King, a finance executive, proposing an online platform for young Singaporeans to Martino Tan, a social media manager for Singapore's Prime Minister Lee Hsien Loong in 2012. Together with Belmont Lay, a co-founder of New Nation, a Singapore online satirical news website, the trio experimented with producing content for the website, with inspirations from the style of BuzzFeed publication. Their first article in August 2013, 48 reasons why you still feel for Singapore, crashed their servers for two hours after being shared widely. 

In February 2014, the website was officially launched. It was initially funded by social enterprise, Project Fisher-Man, which is headed by civil servant veteran, Philip Yeo. Former foreign minister of Singapore, George Yeo, was its advisor as well. On 2 April 2014, the website registered for a class license issued under the Broadcasting Act. After the Media Development Authority had introduced a new framework for websites with local news content in 2013, the website sought MDA for advice if it should be licensed under the framework as well. In 2015, the website was told by MDA that it met the threshold that requires the website to be registered. As part of the requirements, the website had to put up a  bond.

In 2016, Mothership.sg website was registered as Bridgewater Holdings Pte Ltd. This was done to change its funding structure from being supported by a social enterprise to a fully commercial media business. It was determined that without commercialising the website and depended on funding from Project Fisher-Man, the website would potentially have run out of funding by the end of 2015.

In 2021, Reuters Institute for the Study of Journalism issued a Digital News Report in which indicated that Mothership was used by 42% of Singapore's population. On 18 February 2022, the site made a mistake and published an infographic on the Goods and Services Tax hike ahead of an embargo of the news. As a result, the site had its press accreditation suspended for six months after an appeal was submitted to the Ministry of Communications and Information, thus losing access to press conferences and media briefings held by government agencies.

References

External links
 

2014 establishments in Singapore
Internet properties established in 2014
Online publishing companies
Singaporean news websites